Czech Republic–Spain relations are the bilateral and diplomatic relations between these two countries. Relationships are mainly defined by the membership of both countries to the European Union and NATO. The Czech Republic has an embassy in Madrid and consulates in Barcelona, Benidorm, Bilbao, Oviedo, Palma de Mallorca and Santa Cruz de Tenerife. Spain has an embassy in Prague, as well as an Education Attaché, a Commercial Office and an Instituto Cervantes; the Delegation of Spanish Tourism for this country operates from Vienna.

Diplomatic relations 

Spain recognized the Czech Republic and established diplomatic relations with it on January 1, 1993, the day the Czechoslovakia division materialized. In the previous years the relations between this country and Spain had gained in intensity with the restoration of democracy and the fall of communism in 1989. With the new Czech Republic in these three decades, relations have increased, especially favored by the accession of the Czech Republic to the EU. Good examples of this are the increase in Spanish investments, the remarkable and continued growth of commercial exchanges, the flow of Spanish tourists to the Czech Republic, the also notable number of Czechs visiting Spain, the appreciable interest in Spanish cultural activities and those of the Cervantes Institute in Prague.

The last official visit of the Head of the Czech State President Václav Klaus to Spain took place in September 2004. For their part, the Princes of Asturias visited Prague in September 2005 on the occasion of the inauguration of the Cervantes Institute in this capital.

On the occasion of the celebration of the Czech Presidency and the Spanish Presidency of the EU in the first half of 2009 and the first half of 2010, the visit of the Czech Prime Minister, Mirek Topolánek to Madrid in preparation for the Czech Presidency of the EU in September 2008 and the visit of the President of the Spanish Government, José Luis Rodríguez Zapatero to Prague to attend the Informal Meeting of Chiefs of State and Government with the US President Barack Obama on April 4 and 5, 2009.

The Czech Foreign Minister Karel Schwarzenberg visited Spain on February 16, 2012, meeting with his Spanish counterpart. The president of the Senate Pío García-Escudero traveled to Prague to participate in the state funeral of the former president Václav Havel on December 23, 2011.

Economic relations 
Trade exchanges have grown intensely since 1993. From that year to 2013, Spanish exports to the Czech Republic have increased.
multiplied by approximately 20 and Spanish imports from this country have multiplied by 30. The trade balance of Spain with the Czech Republic has traditionally been deficient, and the result of a commercial relationship based mainly in the industrial sector, which accounts for more than 30% of Czech GDP, and in which it has a long historical experience.

Cooperation 
The Hispanic-Czech bilateral institutional relations in the cultural field are framed in an executive program of collaboration in the field of education and culture, in accordance with the Treaty of Cultural Cooperation between Spain and Czechoslovakia signed in 1979, to which the Czech Republic is a party as a successor State.

See also  
 Foreign relations of the Czech Republic 
 Foreign relations of Spain
 Accession of the Czech Republic to the European Union

References 

 
Spain
Czech Republic